Pekka Vanninen (29 January 1911 – 13 February 1970) was a Finnish cross-country skier who won six national titles over 50 km, in 1937–38, 1946 and 1948–50. He competed in this event at the 1948 Winter Olympics and finished fourth, 20 seconds behind his younger brother Benjamin. Pekka served as the Finnish flag bearer at those Olympics.

Cross-country skiing results
All results are sourced from the International Ski Federation (FIS).

Olympic Games

World Championships

References

1911 births
1970 deaths
People from Sortavalsky District
People from Viipuri Province (Grand Duchy of Finland)
Finnish male cross-country skiers
Olympic cross-country skiers of Finland
Cross-country skiers at the 1948 Winter Olympics
20th-century Finnish people